Everything and Nothing is a compilation album by David Sylvian. Released in October 2000, the album contains previously released and unreleased, re-recorded, and alternate versions of tracks from Sylvian's twenty years with Virgin Records. The record peaked at no.57 in the UK albums chart.

It was released in two versions. A standard 2CD jewel case (CDVD 2897) and (in the UK) as a limited edition 3CD digipak (CDVDX 2897).

In addition to tracks from Sylvian's solo career and earlier with the group Japan ("Ghosts"), the album also includes previously unreleased material ("Some Kind of Fool", "The Scent of Magnolia", "Ride" and "Cover Me with Flowers" among others) along with collaborations ("Bamboo Houses" and "Heartbeat" with Ryuichi Sakamoto and "Buoy" with Mick Karn). 
The songs "Come Morning" and "Golden Way" were taken from the 1995 album Marco Polo by the World music duo Nicola Alesini & Pier Luigi Andreoni, on which Sylvian provided vocals for three of the songs.

"Thoroughly Lost to Logic", a piece written 1991, contained Sylvian reading a poem, which appeared on Sakamoto's composition "Salvation" from his work "Discord" released in 1998. This version was completed 2000.

Four tracks on the album were recorded during the making of Sylvian's 1999 album Dead Bees on a Cake but did not make the final cut on the album.

Track listing

Personnel
This is a list of guest musicians exclusively about the unreleased tracks. For the other tracks, see respective albums.

"The Scent of Magnolia": Bill Frisell (guitar), Ingrid Chavez (vocals), John Giblin (bass), Ryuichi Sakamoto (string arrangement, sampler, piano), Andreas Allen (drum programming), Sebastian Morton (drum programming).
"Albuquerue (Dobro #6)": Bill Frisell (dobro).
"Ride": Ryuichi Sakamoto (piano, string arrangement) Steve Jansen (drums), Danny Thompson (double bass), David Torn (electric guitar), Mark Isham (trumpet), Phil Palmer (acoustic guitar).
"The Golden Way": Damiano Puliti (cello), Nicola Alesini (soprano sax, keyboards, drum programming), Steve Jansen (drum programming), Pier Luigi Andreoni (keyboards).
"Pop Song": John Taylor (piano), Steve Jansen.
"Thoroughly Lost to Logic": Keith Tippett (piano), Mark Sanders (drums)
"Cover Me with Flowers": Steve Jansen (percussion), Steve Tibbetts (guitars).
"Aparna and Nimisha (Dobro # 5)": Bill Frisell (dobro).
"Some Kind of Fool": Ingrid Chavez (vocals), Ann O'Dell (string and brass arrangement) Mick Karn (sax, brass arrangement), Rob Dean (guitar), Richard Barbieri (piano), Steve Jansen (drums), Simon House (violin).
"Buoy": Steve Jansen (drums, vocals), Mick Karn (vocals, saxophones, keyboards)
"Come Morning": Arturo Stalteri (bouzouki), Nicola Alesini (keyboards, clarinet, drum programming, sax), Pier Luigi Andreoni (keyboards, percussion)
"The Blinding Light of Heaven" (studio): Jerry Marotta, Marc Anderson, Trey Gunn.

References

2000 compilation albums
Albums produced by Steve Nye
David Sylvian compilation albums
Virgin Records compilation albums